Charles Stevenson may refer to:

Charles Stevenson (philosopher) (1908-1979), American philosopher.
Charles Alexander Stevenson (1855–1950), Scottish lighthouse engineer
Charles A. Stevenson (1851–1929), Irish-born American stage and movie actor (aka Charles Alexander Stevenson)
Charles C. Stevenson (1826–1890), Governor of Nevada, US
Charles Stevenson (actor) (1887–1943), American actor
Chuck Stevenson (1919–1995), American racecar driver
Charles Marchant Stevenson (1927–2004), American artist

See also
Charles Stephenson (disambiguation)